Residency Road is the busiest road in Srinagar. This road is so named because it used to be the area of British Residency. It leads to Lal Chowk.

History
Residency Road was an important road during colonial period. The sideways of this road contains various Chinar trees.

Major public/private institutions in Residency Road
 Kashmir Arts Emporium.

 Jammu and Kashmir Peoples Democratic Party Head Office.
 J&K Bank 
 Hotel Residency 
 Ahdoos Hotel 
 State Bank of India city branch

References

Roads in Jammu and Kashmir